Eulithidium adamsi is a species of minute colorful sea snail, a marine gastropod mollusk in the family Phasianellidae, the pheasant shells.

Description
The shell grows to a height of 3.8 mm.
The elongate shell has a pointed ovate shape. It is rather thin, smooth, and shining. The spire is conic. It contains about 5 rather convex whorls, separated by well impressed sutures. The rose colored apex is acute. The oval aperture is oblique. The outer lip is thin and translucent. The Columella has with a white callus which is somewhat distended at the slightly impressed and grooved subperforate or imperforate umbilical region. The color of the shell is white, yellow or pale rose, more or less clouded longitudinally with rose, orange or brown, sometimes only with subsutural and peripheral series of short flammules. The entire surface is closely and regularly punctate with pink or orange, and white.

Distribution
This species occurs in the Gulf of Mexico, the Caribbean Sea and the Lesser Antilles.

References

 Abbott R. T. (1974). American Seashells. The marine mollusca of the Atlantic and Pacific coast of North America. II edit. Van Nostrand, New York 663 p. + 24 pl: 
page(s): 62
 Rosenberg, G., F. Moretzsohn, and E. F. García. 2009. Gastropoda (Mollusca) of the Gulf of Mexico, pp. 579–699 in Felder, D.L. and D.K. Camp (eds.), Gulf of Mexico–Origins, Waters, and Biota. Biodiversity. Texas A&M Press, College Station, Texas.

Phasianellidae
Gastropods described in 1853
Taxa named by Rodolfo Amando Philippi